Gorodovikovsky District (Başntan rayon) is an administrative and municipal district (raion), one of the thirteen in the Republic of Kalmykia, Russia. It is located in the west of the republic. Its administrative center is the town of Gorodovikovsk. As of the 2010 Census, the total population of the district was 17,295, with the population of Gorodovikovsk accounting for 55.3% of that number.

History
The district was established in 1920. Until April 1960, the district was known as Zapadny District (i.e., Western District).

Administrative and municipal status
Within the framework of administrative divisions, Gorodovikovsky District is one of the thirteen in the Republic of Kalmykia. It is divided into one town (an administrative division with the administrative center in the town (an inhabited locality) of Gorodovikovsk) and six rural administrations, which comprise eighteen rural localities. As a municipal division, the district is incorporated as Gorodovikovsky Municipal District. The Town of Gorodovikovsk is incorporated as an urban settlement, and the six rural administration are incorporated as six rural settlements within the municipal district. The town of Gorodovikovsk serves as the administrative center of both the administrative and municipal district.

References

Notes

Sources

Districts of Kalmykia
 
States and territories established in 1920